Rabidosa punctulata, the dotted wolf spider, is a species of spider in the family Lycosidae. It is found in areas of weeds and tall grasses. It is a light-brown and large wolf spider with stripes on the cephalothorax and an abdomen with light spots and a dark middle stripe. Its range spreads from Massachusetts west to Kansas south to Texas and Northern Florida.

References

Endemic fauna of Virginia
Lycosidae
Spiders of the United States
Spiders described in 1844